Marco Ciardi (born 25 July 1969 in Sweden) is a Swedish retired footballer who is last known to have played for Västerås SK Fotboll in his home country.

Career

Ciardi started his senior career with Vasalunds IF. In 1997, he signed for Ayr United in the Scottish Championship, where he made eight appearances and scored zero goals. After that, he played for Swedish club Västerås SK Fotboll before retiring in 1998.

References

External links 
 Ciardi's Swede on Ayr dream 
 500 AIK:are - Marco Ciardi 
 Matchens fanbärare: Marco Ciardi 
 Fotboll. Marco Ciardi bakom allt 
 Ciardi ersätter Nordin 
 Spelarbetyg på VSK:s fotbollsspelare 1998 

1969 births
Living people
Association football midfielders
Ayr United F.C. players
AIK Fotboll players
Västerås SK Fotboll players
Swedish people of Italian descent
Swedish footballers
Expatriate footballers in Scotland
Vasalunds IF players
Vitória S.C. players
Expatriate footballers in Portugal